Holmium(III) fluoride is an inorganic compound with a chemical formula of HoF3. It can be produced by reacting holmium oxide and ammonium fluoride, then crystallising it from the ammonium salt formed in solution, or by directly reacting holmium with fluorine. It is a yellowish powder that is hard to dissolve in water.

References

Holmium compounds
Fluorides
Lanthanide halides